Richard S. Todd (October 2, 1914 – November 9, 1999) was an American football player and coach for the Washington Redskins of the National Football League (NFL).

During his eight-year playing career between 1939 and 1948, Todd played both offense and defense as a fullback and defensive back.  In his career, Todd had 1,573 yards and 11 touchdowns rushing, and 1,826 yards and 20 touchdowns receiving. He also scored two touchdowns on punt returns.

Todd was named interim coach of the Redskins for nine games in the 1951 season, amassing a 5–4 record. Four years later, Todd was named head coach for the final two Midwestern State Mustangs football team seasons in 1955 and 1956, before the program was placed on a five-year moratorium which would last 32 seasons.

He played college football at Texas A&M University.

Head-coaching record

College

References

External links
 

1914 births
1999 deaths
American football defensive backs
American football fullbacks
Iowa Pre-Flight Seahawks football players
Midwestern State Mustangs football coaches
Texas A&M Aggies football players
Washington Redskins coaches
Washington Redskins players
United States Navy personnel of World War II
People from Foard County, Texas
People from Williamson County, Texas
Coaches of American football from Texas
Players of American football from Texas
Washington Redskins head coaches